The Ophidian Trek is the second live album by Swedish extreme metal band Meshuggah and directed by Anthony Dubois. Recordings were compiled from various locations in Europe and the US in 2013 and Wacken Open Air 2013.

Track listing

DVD/Blu-Ray
 "Swarmer"
 "Swarm"
 "Combustion" (Wacken)
 "Rational Gaze" (Wacken)
 "obZen"
 "Lethargica"
 "Do Not Look Down" (Wacken)
 "The Hurt That Finds You First"
 "I Am Colossus"
 "Bleed"
 "Demiurge" (Wacken)
 "New Millennium Cyanide Christ" (Wacken)
 "Dancers to a Discordant System"
 "Mind’s Mirrors / In Death – Is Life / In Death – Is Death"
 "The Last Vigil"

CD 1

CD 2

Personnel
Jens Kidman – vocals
 Fredrik Thordendal – lead guitar
 Mårten Hagström – rhythm guitar
 Tomas Haake – drums
 Dick Lövgren – bass

References

Meshuggah albums
2014 video albums
Live video albums
2014 live albums
Nuclear Blast live albums
Nuclear Blast video albums
Concert films